Cotaxtla is  a city in the Mexican state of Veracruz. 
It is located 45 km from the  city of Veracruz on Federal Highway 180. Major products in Cotaxtla are corn, sugar, and fruits.

External links 
  Municipal Official Site
  Municipal Official Information

Populated places in Veracruz